Galium desereticum is a plant species in the  Rubiaceae. It is native to the states of Nevada and Utah in the southwestern United States.

The species is named for Deseret, a provisional state of the United States proposed by early settlers in the region; it comprised most of present-day Utah and Nevada plus sections of surrounding states.

References

desereticum
Flora of Nevada
Flora of Utah
Plants described in 1965
Flora without expected TNC conservation status